Lisa Jewell (born 19 July 1968) is a British author of popular fiction. Her books include Ralph's Party, Thirtynothing, After The Party (a sequel to Ralph's Party), and later Then She Was Gone, The Family Upstairs, Invisible Girl and The Night She Disappeared. Her latest book The Family Remains was published in July of 2022.

Life
Jewell was born in London and educated at St. Michael's Catholic Grammar School in Finchley, north London, leaving school after one day in the sixth form to do an art foundation course at Barnet College followed by a diploma in fashion illustration at Epsom School of Art & Design.

She worked in fashion retail for several years, namely Warehouse and Thomas Pink.

After being made redundant, Jewell accepted a challenge from her friend, Yasmin Boland, to write three chapters of a novel in exchange for dinner at her favourite restaurant. Those three chapters were eventually developed into Jewell's debut novel Ralph's Party, which then became the UK's bestselling debut novel in 1999.

In 2008 she was awarded the Melissa Nathan Award For Comedy Romance for her novel 31 Dream Street.

She currently lives in Swiss Cottage, London with her husband Jascha, and daughters Amelie Mae (born 2003) and Evie Scarlett (born 2007).

Bibliography

Novels
 Ralph's Party (1999)
 Thirtynothing (2000)
 One Hit Wonder (2001)
 A Friend of the Family (2004)
 Vince and Joy (2005)
 31 Dream Street (2007)
 Roommates Wanted (2008) – alternative title for 31 Dream Street
 The Truth About Melody Browne (2009)
 After The Party  (2010)
 The Making of Us  (2011)
 Before I Met You  (2012)
 The House We Grew Up In (2013)
 The Third Wife (2014)
 The Girls (aka The Girls in the Garden) (2015)
 I Found You (2016)
 Then She Was Gone (2017)
 Watching You (2018)
 The Family Upstairs (2019)
 Invisible Girl (2020)
 The Night She Disappeared (2021)
 The Family Remains (2022)

References

External links
 Lisa Jewell's official Facebook Page
 Lisa Jewell's Twitter profile
 Lisa Jewell official site

1968 births
English women novelists
British chick lit writers
Living people
People from Finchley
People educated at St. Michael's Catholic Grammar School
Writers from London